Jaish-e-Mohammed (literally "The Army of Muhammad", abbreviated as JeM) is a  Pakistan-based
Deobandi Jihadist militant group active in Kashmir which is widely considered as a terrorist group. The group's primary motive is to separate Kashmir from India and merge it into Pakistan.

Since its inception in 2000, the group has carried out several attacks in the state of Jammu and Kashmir. It portrays Kashmir as a "gateway" to the entire India, whose Muslims are also deemed to be in need of liberation. It has carried out several attacks primarily in the Indian administered Jammu and Kashmir. It also maintained close relations with the Taliban and Al-Qaeda in Afghanistan and continues to be allied with these groups.

JeM was apparently created with the support of Pakistan's Inter-Services Intelligence (ISI), which uses it to fight in Kashmir and other places, and continues to provide it backing. The JeM has been banned in Pakistan since 2002, but resurfaced under other names. Its apparent variants openly continue to operate several facilities in the country.

According to B. Raman, Jaish-e-Mohammed is viewed as the "deadliest" and "the principal Islamic terrorist organisation in Jammu and Kashmir". The group was responsible for several terror attacks: the 2001 attack on Jammu and Kashmir legislative assembly, the 2001 Indian Parliament attack, the 2016 Pathankot airbase attack, the 2016 attack on the Indian Mission in Mazar-i-Sharif, the 2016 Uri attack, and the 2019 Pulwama attack, each of which has had strategic consequences for India–Pakistan relations. The group has been designated as a terrorist organisation by Pakistan, Russia, Australia, Canada, India, New Zealand, the United Arab Emirates, the European Union, the United Kingdom, the United States, and the United Nations.

In 2016, Jaish was suspected of being responsible for an attack on the Pathankot airbase in India. The Indian government, and some other sources, accused Pakistan of assisting Jaish in conducting the attack. Pakistan denied assisting Jaish, and arrested several members of Jaish in connection with the attack, who were then released by the security establishment according to a report in Dawn. Pakistan called the report an "amalgamation of fiction and fabrication".

In February 2019, the group took responsibility for a suicide bombing attack on a security convoy in the Pulwama district that killed 40 security personnel, named as one of the largest attacks in recent years.

Origins
Pakistan's Inter-Services Intelligence (ISI) is said to have created Jaish-e-Mohammed by working with several Deobandi Islamic jihadis associated with Harkat-ul-Mujahideen. By the late 1990s, states Ahmed Rashid, the Pakistani military justified jihad in Kashmir as a legitimate part of its foreign policy. Harkat had been set up in mid-1990s with ISI support to carry out "spectacular acts of terrorism". The United States declared it an Islamic jihadist group in 1998 and bombed its training camps in Afghanistan.

In December 1999, Harkat Islamic jihadis hijacked the Indian Airlines Flight 814 scheduled to fly from Kathmandu to Delhi, and diverted it to Kandahar, where they were looked after by the Afghan Taliban and the Pakistani officials stationed at the airport. After they slit the throat of a passenger, the Indian government agreed to their demands and released Maulana Masood Azhar, Ahmed Omar Saeed Sheikh and Mushtaq Ahmed Zargar, three Harkat operatives previously imprisoned in India. The released prisoners were escorted to Pakistan by the ISI, and Masood Azhar was chosen to head the new group Jaish-e-Mohammed. The ISI is said to have paraded him on a victory tour through Pakistan to raise money for the new organisation. Some analysts argue that ISI built up the JeM to counter the growing power of Lashkar-e-Taiba (LeT). Many analysts believed that around 1999, Pakistan's Inter-Services Intelligence (ISI) used JeM to fight in Kashmir and other places, and continues to provide it backing. Although the JeM has been officially banned in Pakistan since 2002, it continues to openly operate several facilities in the country.

Azhar's leadership is said to be nominal. The group has a largely decentralised structure. JeM's membership, drawn from the former members of Harkat-ul-Mujahideen, was allied to the Taliban in Afghanistan and Al Qaeda. The members had shared the Al Qaeda training camps in Afghanistan and carried loyalty to Al Qaeda. A majority of the members of Harkat are said to have followed Azhar into the newly founded group, leaving Harkat under-funded and under-supported.

History

2000–2001
On 20 April 2000, JeM carried out the first suicide bombing in Kashmir, exploding a bomb in an Indian army barracks. Five Indian soldiers were killed.

Following the September 11 attacks in the United States, the Musharraf government joined the United States in the War on Terror, assuming that the move would give it a free hand in supporting militancy in Kashmir. In October 2001, JeM carried out a bombing near the Jammu and Kashmir legislative assembly, killing 38 people and claiming responsibility for it. In December 2001, JeM and LeT militants launched a fidayeen attack on the Indian Parliament waging a battle with the security personnel. Eight security personnel and a gardener were killed, but the attack was foiled. JeM claimed responsibility for the attack, but removed the announcement a day later under pressure from the ISI. The Indian Government accused the LeT and JeM of being involved in the attack. Subsequently, four JeM members were caught by Indian authorities and put on trial. All four were found guilty of playing various roles in the incident. One of the accused, Afzal Guru, was sentenced to death.

Security specialist Bruce Riedel comments that even by the standards of modern terrorism, this was an extraordinary attack. If the Prime Minister or a senior party leader of India was killed in the attack, India would have been forced to retaliate militarily. In the event, India called the terror attack an "attack on democracy" and began large-scale troop mobilisation at the India-Pakistan border, launching the largest war games in fifteen years. Pakistan retaliated by launching its own war games, moving troops from the Afghan border to the Indian border. The United States, annoyed with the dilution of the War on Terror as well as the threat of an Indo-Pakistani war, delivered an ultimatum to Musharraf, asking him to make "a clear statement to the world that he intends to crack down on terror". Pushed to a corner, Musharraf announced on 12 January 2002 that no organisation would be allowed to indulge in terrorism in the name of Kashmir. He declared a ban on five extremist groups including the JeM. Hundreds of militants were rounded up, states Ahmed Rashid, giving rise to severe hostility and derision from them. However, by March 2002, all the arrested militants were freed and curbs on them were quietly lifted. Financial and intelligence inputs to JeM were resumed. Masood Azhar was released under a court order.

Bans, revolts and split 
Earlier in 2001, when the group anticipated that the US State Department would declare it a foreign Islamic jihadist organisation, it renamed itself Tehrik-ul-Furqan and transferred its assets to low-profile supporters. JeM was declared a foreign Islamic jihadist organisation by the United Nations in October 2001 and by the US in December 2001.

In response to the January 2002 ban by Pakistan, JeM changed its name to Khuddam ul-Islam. Khuddam was also banned in 2003, after which it re-branded itself as a charity called Al-Rehmat Trust through which they are accused of raising funds for their activities.

By this time, the JeM had split into two groups, due to conflicts among the members. Three JeM commanders, Abdul Jabbar, Maulana Umar Farooq and Abdullah Shah Mazhar, left the group and formed Jamaat ul-Furqan. The remaining group that stayed with Masood Azhar used the name Khuddam ul-Islam.

The rank and file of the JeM were angered by Musharraf's U-turn in joining the War on Terror. By staying loyal to the Pakistani state, Masood Azhar lost majority support in the JeM Supreme Council, who demanded his resignation. Particularly influential among the rebels was Maulana Abdul Jabbar, whose faction led a jihad against what they called the "slave" government of Pakistan and the US influence upon it. They were supported by Al Qaeda, and joined by members of Lashkar-e-Taiba, Lashkar-e-Jhangvi and Harkatul Mujahideen.

From March to September 2002, the rebels carried out suicide missions on Pakistani officials in cities like Islamabad, Karachi, Murree, Taxila and Bahawalpur. After the fall of the Taliban government, the JeM activists returning from Afghanistan attacked Christian temples, Shia mosques and diplomatic missions inside Pakistan. The ISI demanded Masood Azhar to rein in the rank-and-file. However he had lost control over them. He maintained that they were already expelled from the organisation and the state should arrest them. In fact, most of the factions remained within the JeM and competed with the parent organisation for authority and resources. Some rebellious factions gathered around Abdul Jabbar who launched Jamaat-ul-Furqan in late 2002. The rebel factions were supported by "rogue" members of the ISI.

In November 2003, the Musharraf government banned the renamed Khuddam ul-Islam as well as Jamaat-ul-Furqan. Then the rebels carried out two assassination attempts on President Musharraf himself, on 14 December and 25 December 2003. There was evidence of Pakistan military members providing logistical support for the attempts. The explosives used in the bombings were traced to an Al Qaeda camp in South Waziristan. Masood Azhar too had publicly called for the assassination of Musharraf.

Eventually, the government cracked down on the rogue elements in the military and intelligence establishments. More than a hundred members were apprehended and dismissed, with some members being sentenced to death. However, the majority of the militant infrastructure was left intact. Azhar's group, which had fallen into relative obscurity by 2004, was allowed to rebuild itself after the problematic portions of the leadership were purged. The rebellious factions eventually realigned themselves with Tehrik-i-Taliban Pakistan (Pakistani Taliban) in 2007.

Revival
Masood Azhar stayed loyal to the Pakistani state after 2004. Pakistan in turn protected his group despite the official bans. The group continued to grow in Bahawalpur. In 2009, it was reported to have built a large 6.5 acre walled complex in Bahawalpur, along with a swimming pool and a stable for a dozen horses, which could be used for training militants. India Today later revealed that the complex has been branded as 'Jamia Masjid Subhan Allah' and that it was 8 km. away from the headquarters of Pakistan Army's 31 Corps. In the centre of the city, the group runs an "imposing" madrassa, attended by hundreds of children every year. In 2008, the organisation held a massive three-day rally in the city, with its own armed security guards posted at all the entrances to the city centre. The police were conspicuous by their absence.

Masood Azhar kept a low profile for several years until he resurfaced in 2014, giving fiery speeches calling for more attacks on India and the United States. He boasted of having 300 suicide attackers at his command and threatened to kill Narendra Modi if he were to become the Prime Minister.

Bruce Riedel connects the revival of JeM to the return to office of Prime Minister Nawaz Sharif, who had long advocated a 'détente' with India. The developing links between him and the Indian Prime Minister Narendra Modi, especially following the latter's visit to Lahore on the Christmas Day in 2015, angered the group.

2016
A week after Narendra Modi's visit, in January 2016, the group launched an attack on the Pathankot air base in which seven security personnel were killed. This was immediately followed by an attack on the Indian consulate in Mazar-i-Sharif in Afghanistan.
Both India and Pakistan condemned the attack and stayed on course with their peace process. Pakistan has also followed on the leads provided by India and carried out raids on the offices of JeM. It announced the formation of a joint investigation team with India to investigate the attack. It was also announced that Masood Azhar was taken into "protective custody". However, JeM issued a statement denying that anybody had been arrested.

In April 2016, the JeM chief Masood Azhar was said to be free but "within reach, if needed". According to Riaz Hussain Pirzada, the Member of National Assembly from Bahawalpur, the "breeding grounds" still remained and the madrassas were still being financed. According to an official, Nawaz Sharif ordered the Counterterrorism Department to crack down on the organisation but, in a high-level meeting, the army chief General Raheel Sharif pressured the Prime Minister to hand over the crackdown to the Army, after which "no one knows what happened". Dawn reported the Punjab Chief Minister Shahbaz Sharif as saying that, whenever civilian authorities took action against certain groups, the security establishment worked behind the scenes to set them free. The government however denied the accuracy of the report.

Following the onset of the 2016 Kashmir unrest in Indian Jammu and Kashmir, all the jihadi groups in Pakistan held rallies in major cities like Lahore. The JeM was seen openly raising funds for jihad.

In September 2016, jihadi militants attacked the Indian brigade headquarters in Uri, close to the Line of Control in Jammu and Kashmir. The attack resulted in the death of 19 soldiers, described as the deadliest attack in over two decades. India suspected JeM for the attack. It also made its feelings felt with heavy rhetoric, the Indian Home Minister calling Pakistan a "terrorist state" and noting that the perpetrators were "highly trained, heavily armed, and specially equipped". Pakistan denied involvement. India then launched a diplomatic offensive, trying to isolate Pakistan in the world community. On 28 September, it declared that it had carried out "surgical strikes" on alleged JeM camps in Pakistani-administered Kashmir. The claim was however denied by Pakistan.

2019 
On 14 February 2019, Jaish-e-Mohammed carried out and claimed responsibility  for a suicide attack in Lathpora near Awantipora in Pulwama District in Kashmir on a convoy of security forces that killed at least 40 Indian personnel. A bus carrying 39 Central Reserve Police Force personnel was rammed by a car carrying 350 kg of explosives.

On 26 February 2019, 12 Indian Air Force Mirage 2000 jets crossed the Line of Control, and dropped precision-guided bombs on an alleged Jaish-e-Mohammed training camp in Balakot, a town in the Khyber province of Pakistan. The Pakistani government denied that any damage was caused by the bombs. In the process, Pakistan shot down an Indian Aircraft capturing its pilot and releasing him back to the Indian government as a Peace gesture.

On 27 August 2019, two members of a nomadic community were killed by terrorists believed to be members of Jaish-e-Mohammed in the higher reaches of Tral in south Kashmir after they were abducted from their temporary shelter.

2021 
After the Taliban seizure of Afghanistan, many JeM cadres were released, the JeM and Taliban have held meetings and the JeM has been assured of all support in carrying out its activities in India.  The Hindustan Times reported on Oct 27, 2021 that JeM's leader Masood Azhar met w/ Taliban leaders including Mullah Baradar in Khandar in late August 2021 seeking their help in the Kashmir fight.

Ideology and goals
The declared objective of the JeM is to liberate Kashmir and merge it with Pakistan. However, it projects Kashmir as a "gateway" to the entire India, whose Muslims are also deemed to be in need of liberation. After liberating Kashmir, it aims to carry its jihad to other parts of India, with an intent to drive Hindus and other non-Muslims from the Indian subcontinent.

JeM also aims to drive the United States and Western forces from Afghanistan. The JeM leader Masood Azhar is reported to have said in a speech in Karachi:

In late 2002, Christians were targeted across Pakistan and the gunmen belonging to JeM were caught for the acts. Some members have attacked members of the Pakistani state and western targets inside Pakistan. The American journalist Daniel Pearl was abducted and murdered by Ahmed Omar Sheikh.

Organisation

Leadership
JeM's founder and leader (emir) is Maulana Masood Azhar, who had earlier been a leader of Harkat-ul-Mujahideen. Having trained at the same religious seminary (Jamia Uloom-ul-Islamia in Karachi) as the Taliban founder Mullah Omar, he had long-standing connections to Taliban and Al Qaeda. He had fought in Afghanistan and set up Harkat affiliates in Chechnya, Central Asia and Somalia. He was reputed to have taught the Somalis how to shoot down American Black Hawk helicopters. He was regarded as a close associate of Osama bin Laden, when he was sent to Britain for fund raising in the early 1990s. In 1994 Azhar went to Indian-administered Kashmir on a "mission" and got arrested by Indian security forces. Reportedly, Osama bin Laden wanted Azhar freed and ordered Al Qaeda to arrange the hijacking that led to his release. Subsequently, Azhar was lionized in Pakistan and promoted by the ISI as the leader of the new group Jaish-e-Mohammed. Azhar was specially designated as a "global Islamic terrorist" by the US Treasury Department in 2010.

JeM is run by Azhar's family like a family enterprise. Masood Azhar's brother, Abdul Rauf Asghar, is a senior leader of JeM and its intelligence coordinator. He was one of the hijackers of the flight IC 814 and served as the "acting leader" of JeM in Masood Azhar's absence in 2007. Since 2008, he has been involved with organising suicide attacks in India, including the 2016 Pathankot attack, where he was found to have directed the militants via telephone. Abdul Rauf Asghar has also been designated as a "global terrorists" by the US Treasury department.

Membership
The launch of JeM in Karachi in 2000 was attended by 10,000 armed followers. The majority of the early membership was drawn from Harkat-ul-Mujahideen. Having fought in Afghanistan alongside the Taliban and Al Qaeda, these members carried loyalty to those organisations and enmity towards the United States.

Approximately three-quarters of JeM's membership is drawn from Punjab in Pakistan, from Multan, Bahawalpur and Rahim Yar Khan districts. This region being the main ethnic origin of the Pakistani military corps, ISI believed that the shared ethnicity would make the JeM aligned to the military's strategic goals. There are also a large number of Afghans and Arabs. Several western militants of Pakistani origin have also joined the organisation. Prominent among them are Rashid Rauf, who was involved with a 2006 plot to blow up transatlantic airliners, Shehzad Tanweer, who was involved with the 2005 London Underground bombings, and Ahmed Omar Sheikh, convicted of murdering Daniel Pearl.

Following the split in 2002, the majority of the original fighters left the parent organisation and joined renegade groups. When the organisation was revived by 2009, JeM was believed to have between one and two thousand fighters and several thousand supporting personnel. Masood Azhar claimed having 300 suicide attackers at his command.

Infrastructure
JeM originally operated training camps in Afghanistan, jointly with the other militant groups. After the fall of the Taliban government, it relocated them to Balakot and Peshawar in Khyber-Pakhtunkhwa and Muzaffarabad in Pakistan-administered Kashmir. By 2009, it developed a new headquarters in Bahawalpur in Pakistani Punjab, 420 miles south of Islamabad. These include a madrassa in the centre of the city and a 6.5 acre walled complex that serves as a training facility, including water training and horse back riding. Bahawalpur also serves as a rest and recuperation facility for jihadists fighting in Afghanistan, away from the areas of US drone attacks. It is also close to the bases of other militant groups with which JeM is believed to have operational ties: Lashkar-e-Taiba in Muridke, Sipah-e-Sahaba in Gojra, and Lashkar-e-Jhangvi also based in Punjab. There are at least 500–1000 other madrassas in Bahawalpur, most of which teach a violent version of Islam to children.

Publications
Like other jihadi outfits in the country, JeM distills its ideology through the print media, its publications including the weekly Al-Qalam in Urdu and English, monthly Ayeshatul Binat in Urdu for women and weekly Musalman Bachy for children.

Links to other organisations
When JeM started, it had strong ties to the Taliban and Al-Qaeda, sharing their training camps in Afghanistan, and exchanging intelligence, training and coordination. Bruce Riedel suggests that the 2001 Indian Parliament attack was possibly a "payback" to Al-Qaeda for its earlier help in getting Masood Azhar released. With the Indian reaction to the attack, Pakistan was forced to move its forces from the Afghan border to the Indian border, relieving pressure on Al-Qaeda.

Most of the JeM members with loyalties to the Taliban left to join renegade groups in 2002. However, Masood Azhar's group was noticed recruiting fighters for the Afghan jihad in 2008. In 2010, Pakistan's Interior minister Rehman Malik stated that the JeM, along with Lashkar-e-Jhangvi and Sipah-e-Sahaba Pakistan, were allied to the Taliban and Al-Qaeda. Within South Punjab, the JeM is closely allied to Lashkar-e-Jhangvi and Sipah-e-Sahaba. Scholars Abou Zahab and Roy state that the three organisations appear to be "the same party" focusing on different sectors of activity.

JeM continues to have links to its ancestor, Harkat-ul-Mujahideen. In addition, the group has operational ties to Lashkar-e-Taiba, which it employed in launching the 2001 Indian Parliament attack. It joined the ISI-sponsored United Jihad Council, an umbrella organisation of 13–16 militant organisations that fight in Indian-administered Kashmir.

Khuddam ul-Islam is a militant splinter group of the Jaish-e-Mohammed. It is a Proscribed Organisation in the United Kingdom under the Terrorism Act 2000 and said to be politically aligned with Maulana Fazal-ur-Rehman's faction of Jamiat Ulema-e-Islam.  Some sources believe that Khuddam ul-Islam is simply a restructuring of JeM and that the group is under the command of Mufti Abdul Rauf Asghar, the younger brother of JeM's founder, Maulana Masood Azhar.

Notable attacks
 The group, in co-ordination with Lashkar-e-Taiba, has been implicated in the 2001 Indian Parliament attack in New Delhi.
 It has been suspected in the murder of American journalist Daniel Pearl in Karachi.
 Rahul Gandhi kidnap plot was a failed plot of this militant group to kidnap a prominent Indian political personality in lieu of 42 militant imprisoned in India. Several newspapers reported that the political personality was Rahul Gandhi, scion of the India's Nehru-Gandhi political dynasty. The three Pakistani nationals were arrested  namely Mohammed Abid alias Fateh from Lahore, Yusuf alias Faisal of Multan and Mirza Rashid Beg alias Raja Kajafi of Sialkot.
 An informant, posing as a member of Jaish-e-Mohammed, helped police to arrest four people allegedly plotting to bomb a New York City synagogue as well as to shoot Stinger missiles at military aircraft in the United States. The arrest of the four took place in May 2009. One of the four, by the name of James Cromitie, allegedly expressed the desire to join Jaish-e-Mohammed. This expression allegedly took place approximately a year prior to this arrest.
 In January 2016, members of the group were suspected of carrying out the Pathankot attack.
 In September 2016, the group was accused of carrying out an attack over an army camp at Uri, Kashmir.
 On 14 February 2019, a suicide bomber of the group, Adil Ahmad Dar, carried out a suicide bombing attack on a convoy of security vehicles near Pulwama, Jammu & Kashmir and killed at least 40 CRPF personnel.

See also 
 List of Deobandi organisations
 2009 detention of Americans by Pakistan
 Insurgency in Jammu and Kashmir
 Abdul Rauf Asghar
 Khuddam ul-Islam

References

General bibliography 
 
 
 
 
 
 
 
 
 
 
 
 
 
 
 

2000 establishments in Pakistan
Jihadist groups in Jammu and Kashmir
Groups affiliated with al-Qaeda
Organizations designated as terrorist by Canada
Organisations designated as terrorist by Pakistan
Organizations designated as terrorist by Russia
Organizations established in 2000
Deobandi organisations
Organisations designated as terrorist by India
Organizations designated as terrorist by the United States
Organisations designated as terrorist by Australia
Organizations designated as terrorist by the United Arab Emirates
Organisations designated as terrorist by the United Kingdom
Organizations based in Asia designated as terrorist